Monnow Street is the main shopping street of Monmouth, south east Wales.  It runs for about 500 yards in a south-westerly direction from Agincourt Square to the Monnow Bridge, which crosses the River Monnow.

History and buildings

The road is thought to have existed at least from Roman times.  In the Middle Ages it was a typical market street, known as the "Great Causey", with gates at either end and a wider area in the middle for the trading of livestock and the erection of market stalls.  The market was later concentrated at the northern end of the road (now Agincourt Square), and the road itself became known as Monmouth Street.

Archaeological investigations at properties in the street, led by the Monmouth Archaeological Society, have revealed both Roman and Norman remains, as well as evidence of mediaeval iron working.  The street is described by architectural historian John Newman as a "pleasingly continuous array of C18 and early C19 shops and houses, in the main modestly two-storeyed, with several Victorian interventions".

Notable buildings include Cornwall House, The Vine Tree and the Robin Hood Inn.

Gallery

References

Shopping streets in Wales
Streets and squares in Monmouth, Wales